The Estate Exchange at 46 Fountain Street, Manchester, England, is a Victorian office block by Thomas Worthington.  It was built as Overseers' and Churchwardens' Offices in 1852, with the top two floors being added in 1858. It is a Grade II* listed building as of 3 October 1974.

The building is in an "Italian palazzo style, of red brick with sandstone dressings (and a) slate roof".  Hartwell considers it the best building on Fountain Street: "Each floor is treated differently and there is a range of oeil-de-boeuf windows in stone frames in the attic."

See also

Grade II* listed buildings in Greater Manchester
Listed buildings in Manchester-M2

Notes

References

Grade II* listed buildings in Manchester
Grade II* listed office buildings
Office buildings completed in 1858